Karangasem Regency (Indonesian: Kabupaten Karangasem) is a regency (kabupaten) of Bali, Indonesia. It covers the east part of Bali, has an area of 839.54 km2 and had a population of 396,487 at the 2010 Census which rose to 492,402 at the 2020 Census. Its regency seat is the town of Amlapura.  Karangasem was devastated when Mount Agung erupted in 1963, killing 1,900 people.  Karangasem was a kingdom before Bali was conquered by the Dutch.

Administrative districts
The regency is divided into eight districts (kecamatan), tabulated below with their areas and population totals at the 2010 Census and the 2020 Census. The table also includes the number of administrative villages (rural desa and urban kelurahan) in each district, and its postal codes. 

Note: (a) including 6 small offshore islands.

Tourism
 

Interesting places include:
 The major Pura Besakih Hindu temple, sometimes called the Mother Temple of Besakih.
 Mount Agung, the highest peak in Bali
Telaga Waja River, the only rafting spot at eastern Bali
 Tenganan "the original Bali", a Bali Aga village whose inhabitants who still live according to their ancient traditions
 Amed, a beach town.
 Tulamben, a dive site
 Candidasa, a starting point for visiting the east coast of Bali. East of Candidasa is the village of Bugbug, whose inhabitants celebrate the Perang Dawa (war of the gods) every other year on the full moon of the fourth month, October.
 Prasi Beach in Prasi village, known as Pantai Pasir Putih "White Sandy Beach)" and also as Virgin Beach. Its white sandy beaches are mainly free of crowds, less polluted, and popular for swimming or snorkeling from April to October.  
 Ujung Water Palace, built by the King Anak Agung Agung Anglurah Ketut Karangasem.
 Tirta Gangga water palace
 Puri Agung Karangasem, collectively several royal palaces of the Karangasem kingdom
 Budakeling, an area where both Hindus and Muslims live. Saren Jawa village is home to 100 Muslim families, surrounded by Balinese Hindu villages following the Siwa-Buda belief system, which is a combination of Hinduism and Mahayana Buddhism. The people of Saren Jawa use Balinese first names before their Muslim last names, such as Ni Nyoman Maimunah.
 Seraya Village, which keeps the Gebug Ende tradition related to scarcity of water during drought season
 Mencol Hill, the eastern-most hill on Bali island. It is known as a sunrise viewpoint; the temple at the peak of the grassy hill has a view to the east coast and Gili Selang islet.

References

External links
 
 
  

 
Hindu Buddhist states in Indonesia